The Schmirler Curling Classic was an annual women's curling tournament held in Regina, Saskatchewan. The tournament ran from 2004 to 2011, in honour of the late Sandra Schmirler. It is part of the Women's World Curling Tour. It was suspended in 2012 due to lack of sponsorship.

Event names
2004: SaskPower Schmirler Classic
2005: SaskPower Schmirler Charity Curling Classic
2006, 2007: CUETS Schmirler Charity Classic
2008: CUETS Schmirler Charity Curling Classic
2009-10: Schmirler Curling Classic presented by Bank of America

Past champions

References

Former World Curling Tour events
Curling in Saskatchewan
Sport in Regina, Saskatchewan